Educating the East End is the third series of the British documentary television programme Educating broadcast on Channel 4. The eight-episode first series was first broadcast from 4 September 2014. Its format is based on the BAFTA Award-winning 2011 series Educating Essex and the National Television Award-winning 2013 series, Educating Yorkshire. It follows the everyday lives of the staff and students of Frederick Bremer School in East London which is a comprehensive secondary school.

Episodes

Production
Educating the East End was commissioned by Channel 4 after the success of Educating Yorkshire in 2013 and Educating Essex in 2011.

Ten sixty-minute episodes were commissioned; the first eight were shown from September to October 2014 with the other two episodes acting as specials. The original title for the series was Educating Walthamstow but shortly before transmission the title was changed to Educating the East End.

Before filming began Twofour advised Smith to get into contact with the headteachers of Educating Essex and Educating Yorkshire. They both reportly gave advice on handling the attention and stayed in contact throughout the filming process.

Reception
After the first episode was broadcast, The Guardian gave a favourable review, calling the show "funny, moving and inspirational". The Daily Telegraph also gave the show a good review rating it 4 out of 5 stars and saying "it was charming and found the power of stories".

References

External links
 

2010s British documentary television series
2014 British television seasons
Channel 4 documentary series
English-language television shows
British high school television series
Television series about educators
Television series about teenagers
Television shows set in London